Eminence is a ghost town in Finney County, Kansas, United States.

History
Eminence was founded in 1887.

A post office was opened in Eminence in June 1887, and remained in operation until it was discontinued in 1942.

In popular culture
Eminence is the Federal Emergency Management Agency refugee center established to take evacuees from Denver, Colorado as the event of an explosion at a train derailment and the subsequent detonation of a smuggled Russian nuclear weapon which was in the derailment wreckage in the 1999 TV movie Atomic Train.

References

Further reading

External links
 Finney County Maps: Current, Historic, KDOT

Ghost towns in Kansas
Former populated places in Finney County, Kansas
1887 establishments in Kansas
Populated places established in 1887
Former county seats in Kansas